Shalva Didebashvili (born 1 March 1982) is a German international rugby union player, playing for the SC Neuenheim in the Rugby-Bundesliga and the German national rugby union team.

He made his debut for Germany against Georgia on 6 February 2010. Incidentally, Didebashvili was born in Georgia.

With 15 tries, he was his club's best try scorer in the 2010-11 season.

Stats
Shalva Didebashvili's personal statistics in club and international rugby:

Club

 As of 30 April 2012

National team

 As of 23 March 2010

References

External links
 Shalva Didebashvili at scrum.com
   Shalva Didebashvili at totalrugby.de

1982 births
Living people
Rugby union players from Georgia (country)
German rugby union players
Germany international rugby union players
Soviet emigrants to Germany
SC Neuenheim players
Rugby union flankers